The 2018 Ontario Tankard, known as the Dairy Farmers of Ontario Tankard for sponsorship reasons is the 2018 provincial men's curling championship for Southern Ontario, was held from January 31 to February 4 at the Canada Summit Centre in Huntsville, Ontario. The winning John Epping team represented Ontario at the 2018 Tim Hortons Brier in Regina, Saskatchewan.

The event had a triple knockout format, rather than the traditional round robin event as done in previous years. The number of qualified teams increased from 10 to 12.

Qualification process
12 teams will qualify from two regional qualifiers (three each), a challenge round (three teams), the winner of the Colts competition, plus the top two southern Ontario teams in the CTRS standings (as of December 10, 2017). The east and west 'provincial qualifiers' are preceded by four regional qualifiers in which three teams qualify for the provincial qualifiers, plus the teams ranked 3-10 on the CTRS standings.

Teams

The team lineups are as follows:

Knockout draw brackets
The draw is listed as follows:

A event

B event

C event

Scores

Draw 1
January 31, 2:30pm

Draw 2
January 31, 7:30pm

Draw 3
February 1, 9:30am

Draw 4
February 1, 2:30pm

Draw 5
February 1, 7:30pm

Draw 6
February 2, 9:30am

Draw 7
February 2, 2:30pm

Draw 8
February 2, 7:30pm

Playoffs

A vs. B
February 3, 1:00pm

C1 vs. C2
February 3, 6:30pm

Semifinal
February 4, 9:30am

Final
February 4, 2:30pm

Qualification

The following teams have qualified for the east or west provincial qualifiers based on their ranking on the CTRS standings and will not have to play in the regional qualifiers:

Greg Balsdon (Cataraqui)
Codey Maus (Highland)
Mark Kean (Woodstock)
Wayne Tuck Jr. (Brant)
Richard Krell (Kitchener-Waterloo Granite)
Dayna Deruelle (Brampton) 
John Steski (RCMP) 
Steve Allen (Ottawa)

(Regional) qualifiers

Qualifier #1
December 15–17, at the Renfrew Curling Club, Renfrew

Teams entered:

Connor Duhaime (Cookstown)
Willie Jeffries (Ottawa)
Mike McLean (Navan)
Spencer Richmond (Huntley)
Joseph Smith (Quinte)

Brackets:

Qualifier #2
December 15-17, at the Dixie Curling Club, Mississauga

Teams entered:

Rob Ainsley (Royal Canadian)
Roy Arndt (Dixie)
Matt Glandfield (High Park)
Rob Lobel (Thornhill)
Dennis Moretto (Dixie)
Gregory Park (Oshawa)
Michael Shepherd (Richmond Hill)
Brandon Tippin (Cookstown)

Brackets:

Qualifier #3
December 16–17

Teams entered:

Mark Bice (Sarnia)
Ryan Brown (North Halton)
Ian Dickie (Mississaugua)
Andrew Fairfull (Listowel)
Pat Ferris (Grimsby)
Joe Frans (Oakville)
Brent Gray (Kitchener-Waterloo Granite)
Nathan Martin (Oshawa)
Rob Retchless (Royal Canadian)
Brent Ross (Harriston)
Daryl Shane (Listowel) 
Damien Villard (Galt)

Brackets:

Qualifier #4
Teams entered:

Dale Kelly (Chatham Granite)
Craig Van Ymeren (St. Thomas)

(No event necessary, both teams qualify for provincial qualifiers)

East qualifier
January 12-14 at the RCMP Curling Club, Ottawa

Brackets:

West qualifier
January 12-14, Brant Curling Club, Brantford

Brackets:

Colts Championship
December 6-10 at the Midland Curling Club, Midland

Qualified teams:

Andrew Fairfull (Listowel)
Chris Van Huyse (Scarboro)
Chris Wai (High Park)
Ian Dickie (Mississaugua)
John Young Jr. (Chatham Granite)
Michael Shepherd (Richmond Hill)
Sebastien Robillard (Ottawa)
Terry Corbin (Brantford) 

Standings 
 

Tie-breaker: Robillard 7-2 Van Huyse

Regional qualifiers
Qualifiers in bold. Two teams qualify from each event for the provincial Colts Championship.

Qualifier 1
November 18, Gananoque Curling Club, Gananoque

Teams entered:
Bill Sobering (Cornwall)
Billy Woods (Dalhousie Lake)
Chris Wai (High Park)
Sebastien Robillard (Ottawa)

Qualifier 2

Teams entered:
Andrew Skelton (Guelph)
Chris Van Huyse (Oshawa)
Craig Schinde (Dixie)
Derek Dobson (Richmond Hill)
Michael Shepherd (Richmond Hill)
Nathan Martin (Oshawa)
Ryan O'Neil (Annandale)

Qualifier 3
November 18-19, Penetanguishene Curling Club, Penetanguishene

Teams entered:
Andrew Fairfull (Listowel)
Darryl Hartman (North Halton)
David Ellis (Leaside)
Gregory Park (Oshawa)
Ian Dickie (Oakville)
Scott Jennings (Parry Sound)

Qualifier 4
November 18-19, St. Marys Curling Club, St. Marys

Teams entered: 
Bill Buchanan (Welland)
Dale Kelly (Chatham Granite)
Derek Shackleton (St Marys)
John Young Jr. (Chatham Granite)
Jonathan Duguay (Oakville)
Terry Corbin (Brantford)

Challenge round
''January 19-21 at the Lindsay Curling Club, Lindsay

Triple knockout results:

New teams: 
Gary Grant (Lindsay)
Mac Calwell (Navy)

Brackets:

References

External links
Official site 

2018
2018 in Canadian curling
Huntsville, Ontario
January 2018 sports events in Canada
February 2018 sports events in Canada
Tankard
2018 Tim Hortons Brier